Bocchoris manuselalis is a moth in the family Crambidae. It was described by Rothschild in 1915. It is found on Seram.

The wingspan is about 22 mm. The forewings are buff, the basal two-thirds with two yellow bands and numerous transverse lines, spots and rings of deep umber-brown. There are two broad deep umber-brown bands on the outer one-third. The hindwings are buff with two incomplete curved bands and two subterminal band of deep umber-brown.

References

Moths described in 1915
Spilomelinae